The Meghalaya mining accident happened on 13 December 2018, when 15 miners were trapped in a mine in Ksan, in the Indian state of Meghalaya. While five miners managed to escape, rescue efforts for the remaining 10 continued till 2 March 2019. The tunnel the miners were in flooded with water after they cut into an adjacent mine which was full of water from the nearby Lytein river.

Service personnel from the National Disaster Response Force (NDRF) and the State Disaster Response Force began operations shortly after the miners were trapped. After a request for assistance from the district administration, teams from Coal India, Kirloskar Brothers, the Indian Air Force and the Indian Navy joined the operation to rescue the miners.

Background 
In 2014, Meghalaya's yearly coal production was around 6 million tonnes. In 2014, the National Green Tribunal (NGT), a government body that handles environmental issues in India, issued an order banning mining in Meghalaya, specifically banning mining through the 'rat-hole' technique.

But despite the ban, in subsequent orders following petitions by coal mine owners, the National Green Tribunal and the Supreme Court of India continued to allow transportation of coal dug prior to the enactment of the order on 17 April 2014. On 4 December 2018 the Supreme Court again issued an order that the transportation of coal mined prior to the ban was extended to January 31, 2019. However NGT as well as anti-mining activists have pointed out that illegal mining of fresh coal still continues. In November 2018, two activists were attacked for gathering evidence of illegal coal mining in the area.

Rescue attempts 
Rescue operations started on 13 December. Over 100 service personnel from the National Disaster Response Force (NDRF) and State Disaster Response Force were deployed to rescue the miners. 1,200,000 litres have been pumped out of the mine but this has not helped as rain during the rescue operations and water from the river continues to flood the mine. Divers have also been sent into the mine, but have only been able to reach a depth of 40 feet. Sonar systems as well as cameras have failed to detect the miners.

The local administration had made a request for pumps and other assistance from state owned Coal India on 20 December 2018. But the communication was received by Coal India only on 26 December. On 28 December the Indian Air Force joined in the operations on 28 December 2018, airlifting pumps to the site. Teams from Coal India and Kirloskar Brothers are also providing expertise. On 29 December, a 15-member diving team from the Indian Navy also joined in the operation.

Media reports appeared on 27 December that the miners may be dead on the basis of a statement by a diver of the NDRF, which mentioned the presence of a "foul smell" coming from the mine. The NDRF shortly after clarified that this did not mean the miners were dead, and the foul smell could be coming due to other reasons, such as "stagnated water".

After a petition was filed in the Supreme Court of India, the solicitor general, Tushar Mehta, informed the court that the rescue efforts were additionally difficulty because there were no blueprints for the 355-feet mine where the miners are trapped. Water flowing into the mine from the nearby river was also making the operation more difficult.

The Indian Army and Navy decided to cease operations on 2 March 2019. The operation was one of the longest efforts to rescue miners in India. Only two decomposed bodies were found which were handed over to family members.

Reactions 
The Chief Minister of Meghalaya, Conrad Sangma, has called for regulation of mining in the state, admitting that illegal mining happens in the state. Meghalaya Police arrested the owner of the coal mine on 15 December 2018. Congress leader Rahul Gandhi criticised the Narendra Modi government over the issue.

After a petition was filed in the Supreme Court of India related to the rescue effort. The Supreme Court said on 3 January 2019:

See also 

 Chasnala mining disaster
 Mining accident
 Rajpura Dariba Mine VRM disaster

References 

Mining disasters in India
Coal mining disasters in India
2018 mining disasters
2018 in India